Eungbong Station is a station on the Gyeongui-Jungang Line.

Station layout

Vicinity
Exit 1: Eungbong Elementary School, Gwanghui Middle School

External links
 Station information from Korail

Seoul Metropolitan Subway stations
Railway stations opened in 1978
Metro stations in Seongdong District